Salaq is a village in Kushar District . It is located in the Hajjah Governorate, According to the 2004 census it had a population of 231 people.

External links
Central Statistics Agency of the Republic of Yemen
National Information Center in Yemen

References

Populated places in Hajjah Governorate
Port cities in the Arabian Peninsula
Port cities and towns of the Red Sea